Zenonas Ivinskis (25 May 1908 in Kaušėnai village, near Plungė – 24 December 1971 in Bonn, West Germany) was a noted Lithuanian historian.

Education
Ivinskis studied at Telšiai and Plungė gymnasiums. In 1925 he entered the University of Lithuania to study philosophy, but later changed the subject to history. In 1929, Ivinskis received a grant to continue his studies in Germany. There, under the direction of prof. Albert Brackmann, he received a Ph.D. for his thesis Geschichte des Bauerstandes in Litauen in 1932. In 1933 in Gdańsk he was habilitated for his work Lietuvių ir prūsų prekybiniai santykiai pirmojoje XVI a. pusėje.

After returning to Lithuania he was drafted into the army. During his free time, he gave lectures at the Vytautas Magnus University and in 1940 became an extraordinary professor. In that year he was invited to work at the Vilnius University. He served as the dean of Faculty of Theology–Philosophy at the Vytautas Magnus University from 1941 to 1942. For his active public defense of university autonomy, the Nazis listed him among other prominent public figures to be transferred to Stutthof concentration camp. Ivinskis was saved from death because he was ill, and was hospitalized for half a year.

Emigration
In 1944, Ivinskis retreated to the West. Unlike most other Lithuanian refugees, he did not emigrate to the United States and chose to live in Germany. He gave lectures as Gastprofessor at Baltisches Forchungsinstitut in Bonn, and from 1963 taught the history of Eastern Europe at Bonn University. The next year he received his second habilitation in Lithuanian and Polish history and was appointed as a full-time professor. While living in Germany he often traveled to Rome, and conducted research at the Vatican archives. Ivinskis contributed to the Lithuanian encyclopedias published in Boston.

Important works
Geschichte des Bauerstandes in Litauen, Berlin 1933
Lietuvių ir prūsų prekybiniai santykiai pirmojoje XVI a. pusėje, 1933
Šv. Kazimieras, 1955
Vyskupas Merkelis Giedraitis ir jo laikų Lietuva, manuscript based on research in Vatican archive
Lietuvos istorija (iki Vytauto Didžiojo mirties), Rome 1978

External links
 Short bio 
 Short bio 

1908 births
1971 deaths
20th-century Lithuanian historians
Historians of Lithuania
Lithuanian encyclopedists
Lithuanian male writers
Academic staff of the University of Bonn
People from Plungė
Academic staff of Vilnius University
Vytautas Magnus University alumni
Academic staff of Vytautas Magnus University